Air Chief Marshal Denis Anthony La Fontaine, PVSM, AVSM, VM (17 September 1929 – 6 April 2011) was the 13th Chief of Air Staff of the Indian Air Force from 3 July 1985 to 31 July 1988.

Early life and education 
Born in Madras, Denis Anthony La Fontaine was the son of Major Je La Fontaine of the Indian Army Medical Corps. His family boasted a lineage of Army service. Both his grandfathers served with the Indian Army as officers. La Fontaine studied at St. Anthony's High School at Lahore and at St. George's College at Musoorie.

Air force career 
La Fontaine enrolled into the Indian Air Force in October 1947. He did his training on the Tigermoth aircraft, moving on to Harvards, Supermarine Spitfires and the Hawker Tempest aircraft. La Fontaine was commissioned into the flying branch at Ambala in April 1950.

La Fontaine's first posting was to the No.7 Battle Axes Squadron flying the Tempests aircraft. When No.7 converted to De Havilland Vampires in 1951, La Fontaine was one of the first pilots in the Indian Air Force to undergo training in flying the jets, which were the first jet fighters operated by any country in Asia. Soon after, he was selected to undergo the All Purpose Instructors Course. Over the next three years, La Fontaine spent his career imparting beginner, intermediate and operational instructions in flying in a variety of aircraft, including the Tigermoth aircraft, Harvards, Spitfires and De Havilland Vampires.

In 1956, La Fontaine returned to operational flying, when he was posted to the No.2 Squadron flying the Toofanis. Then he moved onto No.29 Scorpions as a senior flight commander. Command of his own unit came in 1960, wheLa Fontaine  was promoted to squadron leader and was entrusted to raise a new squadron, No.47 Black Archers. This squadron, also flying the Toofanis became the first fighter combat squadron to win the Mukherjee Trophy in its first year of raising. After the upgrading of ranks of the squadron commanders of fighter squadrons, to wing commander, La Fontaine took over command of No.14 Fighting Bulls Squadron at Kalaikunda.

Indo-Pakistani War of 1965 
Flying the Hawker Hunter, La Fontaine was involved in the Indo-Pak Ops of 1965. He led an unfruitful fighter interception sweep over the East Pakistani city of Jessore and an abortive interception to Barrackpore. Aircraft from his unit did take on the Pakistani North American F-86 Sabre over Kalaikunda and No.14 Squadron was the only Hunter unit in 1965 that encountered the enemy Sabres and got the best of them and were still unscathed. Told to lay off operations against targets within East Pakistan, La Fontaine and his team did not see much action later on.

Indo-Pakistani War of 1971 
At the outbreak of the 1971 War, he was deputed as a senior staff officer to the Maritime Air Operations Cell in Bombay to help out civilian airline operations.

Chief of Air Staff 
On the untimely death of the then Chief of Air Staff (CAS) Air Chief Marshal L M. Katre, La Fontaine took over as the CAS in July 1985. After becoming CAS, he oversaw the IAF inducting state-of-the-art defence fighters like the Mirage 2000 and the MiG-29. Both were procured primarily to counter the Pakistani F-16 threat. The IAF was involved in operations for the first time since 1971, when it undertook supply and relief sorties over Sri Lanka. Later after the induction of the IPKF, the IAF was involved in supply and COIN operations. However La Fontaine could not oversee the complete operations of the Indian Peace Keeping Force (IPKF). He retired in 1988, succeeded by Surinder Mehra.

Death 
La Fontaine died of heart attack on 6 April 2011, at his home in Medak district in Andhra Pradesh; he was 82 and is survived by his wife and three daughters. Medak district Collector S Suresh Kumar laid a wreath on Lafontaine's body on behalf of AP government and paid homage.

Awards 
During his tenure he was decorated with the Param Vishisht Seva Medal, Ati Vishisht Seva Medal and Vayu Sena Medal for his distinguished service.

Military honours and decorations

References

Indian aviators
Chiefs of Air Staff (India)
Indian Air Force air marshals
1929 births
2011 deaths
Recipients of the Param Vishisht Seva Medal
Recipients of the Ati Vishisht Seva Medal
Military personnel from Lahore
Indian Air Force officers
National Defence College, India alumni
Recipients of the Vayu Sena Medal